Jiangdi Township is a township in Longsheng Various Nationalities Autonomous County, Guangxi, China.

Administrative division
As of 2016, the township is divided into eight villages: 
 Jiangdi 
 Nitang 
 Jianxin 
 Lijiang 
 Chengling 
 Longtang 
 Dilin 
 Weizi

History
It was incorporated as a township in 1984.

On December 9, 2016, the villages of Chengling, Jianxin and Lijiang was listed among the fourth group of "List of Traditional Villages in China" by the State Council of China. On June 6, 2019, the village of Nitang was listed among the fifth group of "List of Traditional Villages in China" by the State Council of China.

Geography
The township is located in northeastern Longsheng Various Nationalities Autonomous County.

The Sang River, a tributary of the Xun River, passes through the town northeast to southwest.

Economy
The region abounds with copper, gold, and tungsten.

Tourist attractions
The Longsheng Hot Spring is a famous scenic spot in China.

Transportation
The Provincial Highway S219 is a south-north highway in the town. Jiangdi Township is the starting point of the highway.

References

Bibliography

Townships of Guilin